Zdeněk Škára (23 February 1950 – 21 October 2010) was a Czechoslovak handball player who competed in the 1972 Summer Olympics.

Škára was born in Olomouc in February 1950. He was part of the Czechoslovak team which won the silver medal at the Munich Games. He played one match. He died in Olomouc on 21 October 2010, at the age of 60.

References

1950 births
2010 deaths
Czech male handball players
Czechoslovak male handball players
Olympic handball players of Czechoslovakia
Handball players at the 1972 Summer Olympics
Olympic silver medalists for Czechoslovakia
Olympic medalists in handball
Medalists at the 1972 Summer Olympics
Sportspeople from Olomouc